Portrait of Queen Christina of Denmark is late work of the Italian Renaissance master Titian, painted in 1555–1556 as an oil on canvas and now housed in the National Museum of Serbia of Belgrade, Serbia. It depicts Christina of Denmark. This painting was part of collection of Mary of Hungary (1505–1558) already in 1556. Before the World War II was part of Contini Bonacossi Collection.

References 
 
 

1556 paintings
Collections of the National Museum of Serbia
Christina of Denmark
Christina of Denmark
Portraits of women
Cultural depictions of Danish queens